Márcio Cunha is a Portuguese musician known for both his solo work and his use of aliases to deliver a diverse musical output such as Mandrax Icon, Locust of the Dead Earth and most recently Desdém.
He is also a multidisciplinary artist exploring sound, photography and installations.

Cunha embarked on his solo career in 2006 after splitting with his previous Black Metal band Necrokult of Kronos, but only releasing "Mary Climbed the Ladder for The Sun" as Mandrax Icon in 2012. In 2013 he released "Mithridate" as Locust of the Dead Earth and started to release music as Márcio Cunha after being invited by André Trindade and Filipa Cordeiro to write the original soundtrack for the film "Verão Eterno"   Disgusted by the actual state of the music industry, he wrote two short conceptual albums as Desdém: Underdog (2016) and Do The Math (2016), being the music described by Neil Kulkarni on The Wire Magazine as "something gently unhinging that you can slot with USB-ease into your cortex and your day without it ever becoming background or a drag."

In November 2017 he was invited by art curator Patrícia Matos to participate in the exhibition "PLANKTON" to portray his relationship with the subject of food and food chains which resulted in the sound installation "Rob Bob Vicar".
According to his official website, new music is to be released in 2018.

Márcio Cunha discography 
 Verão Eterno (2013)
 Rob Bob Vicar (2016)

Desdém discography 
 Underdog (2016)
 Do The Math (2016)

Locust of the Dead Earth discography 
 Mithridate (2013)

Mandrax Icon discography 
 Mary Climbed the Ladder for the Sun (2012)

Other discography 
 Necrokult of Kronos (with Necrokult of Kronos (2005)

References

External links 
 

Living people
21st-century Portuguese male singers
Art rock musicians
Portuguese pop musicians
Art pop musicians
Male guitarists
Portuguese record producers
Date of birth missing (living people)
Year of birth missing (living people)